Patricia Elizée is a Haitian-American attorney and author. Born in Haiti, she grew up in Miami, Florida. She practices immigration and family law, and served as the president of the Haitian Lawyers Association for 2016-2017. She has published articles in publications such as the Sun Sentinel and the Miami Herald. Françoise Elizée is her sister.

References

External links 
 Patricia Elizee Homepage

Writers from Miami
American legal writers
American women lawyers
American lawyers
Living people
American writers of Haitian descent
Year of birth missing (living people)
21st-century American women